"Rainbow at Midnight" is a novelty song written by Lost John Miller.  The song originally made the Juke Box Folk chart when it was recorded by The Carlisle Brothers in 1946.  "Rainbow at Midnight reached number five on the Juke Box Folk chart.

Cover versions
A few weeks after the Carlisle Brothers release, Ernest Tubb had his third number one on the Juke Box Folk chart with his version of "Rainbow at Midnight".
Early in 1947, Texas Jim Robertson and the Panhandle Punchers released their version of the song which made it to number five on the Juke Box Folk chart, it  was a B-side of "Filipino Baby".
In 1952 Jimmy Wakely recorded "Rainbow at Midnight" with the Nelson Riddle Orchestra.
Jimmie Rodgers had a single release of "Rainbow at Midnight" in 1962 which charted at #62.
George Hamilton IV recorded the song for his May 1965 album release Mister Sincerity - A Tribute to Ernest Tubb.
Webb Pierce recorded the song for his September 1965 album release Country Music Time.
Gene Vincent recorded the song in 1969 for his 1970 album release I'm Back and I'm Proud.
Darrell McCall recorded the song at Singleton Sound Studio in Nashville on March 5 1973 in the sessions for an unreleased album: "Rainbow at Midnight" had a 1973 single release and is featured with the other tracks from its parent session on the 1996 Darrell McCall compilation set The Real McCall.
The German rendering "	Nach vielen Jahren der Reise" was recorded by Lys Assia in 1958.
Blues musician James 'Son' Thomas recorded the song (as "After The War") on his 1987 Rustron LP 1001 Gateway To The Delta.

References
 

 
 

1946 songs
Novelty songs